Sheikh Juma bin Maktoum bin Hasher Al Maktoum (born 1891) was the founder of a branch of the Al Maktoum royal family of Dubai. He was the brother of Saeed bin Maktoum bin Hasher Al Maktoum (Saeed II of Dubai).

Early life	
Sheikh Juma bin Maktoum Al Maktoum was one of at least three sons of Sheikh Maktoum bin Hasher, the ruler of Dubai from 1894 to 1906. The other known sons of Maktoum bin Hasher are Saeed and Hasher. Maktoum bin Hasher was succeeded upon his death by Butti bin Suhail Al Maktoum. Juma's brother Saeed became the emir of Dubai upon the death of Butti bin Suhail in 1912.

Notable descendants
Juma's sons include Sheikh 'Ubaid (born 1918), Sheikh Maktoum (born 1920), Sheikh Hamad (born 1922), Sheikh Thani (born 1924), Sheikh Ahmad (1936–2009), and Sheikh Dalmouk (1937–2004). Through his son Sheikh Maktoum's marriage to a cousin (a daughter of Saeed II), Sheikh Juma is the paternal grandfather of Sheikha Hind bint Maktoum bin Juma Al Maktoum. Sheikha Hind is the senior wife of Saeed II of Dubai's grandson (through his son and successor Rashid bin Saeed Al Maktoum), ruler Mohammed bin Rashid Al Maktoum of Dubai. Sheikh Juma is therefore a great-grandfather to Hind's children, including Crown Prince Hamdan bin Mohammed Al Maktoum.

Another granddaughter of Sheikh Juma's, Sheikha Rodha, through his son Sheikh Ahmad married Mohammed bin Rashid's brother Hamdan bin Rashid Al Maktoum.

Notes

References	
	
1891 births	
Year of death missing	
Maktoum family